Camp Branch is a  long 2nd order tributary to the Swannanoa River in Buncombe County, North Carolina.

Course
Camp Branch rises about 1 mile southeast of Black Mountain, North Carolina in Buncombe County at the base of Miami Mountain.  Camp Branch then flows west-southwest to meet the Swannanoa River about 0.25 miles south of Black Mountain.

Watershed
Camp Branch drains  of area, receives about 50.3 in/year of precipitation, has a topographic wetness index of 238.99 and is about 81% forested.

References

Rivers of North Carolina
Bodies of water of Buncombe County, North Carolina